Esperanza Girón Olivares (born 28 December 1947) is a Mexican sprinter. She competed in the 100 metres at the 1964 Summer Olympics and the 1968 Summer Olympics.

References

1947 births
Living people
Athletes (track and field) at the 1964 Summer Olympics
Athletes (track and field) at the 1968 Summer Olympics
Mexican female sprinters
Olympic athletes of Mexico
Pan American Games competitors for Mexico
Athletes (track and field) at the 1967 Pan American Games
Place of birth missing (living people)
Olympic female sprinters
20th-century Mexican women